The Virginia Commonwealth University College of Engineering is a Richmond-based engineering education institution that offers undergraduate and graduate degrees in biomedical engineering, chemical and life science engineering, computer science, electrical and computer engineering,
and mechanical and nuclear engineering. Established as the "School of Engineering" in 1996, its name and status was officially changed to the College of Engineering in April 2018. The college's dean, Barbara D. Boyan, cited doubled faculty numbers and an increase in funding as reasoning for the switch from school to college.

Upon its founding, initial courses at the VCU school were offered in mechanical, electrical and chemical engineering. The school added a new undergraduate major in biomedical engineering in the fall of 1998. The undergraduate biomedical engineering program is unique in the Commonwealth, established as a response to the growing presence of biomedical companies in Virginia. VCU's long-standing degree programs in computer science joined the school in fall 2001. In May 2000, a graduate degree program in engineering was created and added to the historic graduate programs of biomedical engineering.

Facilities
The first two of the School of Engineering's planned facilities opened in the fall of 1998—the main classroom building and the Virginia Microelectronics Research Center. Together, they total  at a cost of $42 million. To foster growth in enrollment and faculty number, the school embarked on an ambitious campaign to expand facilities, fund endowed scholarships, chairs, and academic programs. The campaign raised more than $67 million to meet these needs.

Current facilities

 West Hall 
 East Hall 
 Microelectronics Lab 
 Health & Life Science Engineering Lab

 Institute for Engineering and Medicine 

 Engineering Research Building 
In January 2008, the school opened East Hall, a  facility housing 48 research labs, 50 faculty offices, six classrooms, and other student spaces allowing for future growth of the college.

Departments
Biomedical Engineering
Chemical and Life Science Engineering
Electrical and Computer Engineering
Computer Science
Mechanical and Nuclear Engineering

Statistics
Alumni: 2,936 
2010 Freshman Class: 291 
2011 Freshman Class: 286 
2011 Freshman Admit SAT Mid 50%: 1190 - 1350 
2011 Freshman Admit SAT Average: 1280 
Fall 2009 Freshmen returning as Sophomores: 80%

Placement after Graduation: 64% full-time employment, 36% Graduate School

Top Employers of Alumni: Mitsubishi nuclear energy, Thomas & Betts Power, Altria, MWV, TRANE, and Infilco Degremont.

Student diversity
Undergraduate Fall 2015 Diversity Statistics
White - 944 students (47.2%)
Asian - 377 students (18.8%)
International - 288 students (14.4%)
Black/African American - 188 students (9.4%)
Hispanic/Latino - 113 students (5.6%)
Two or More Races - 59 students (2.9%)
Unknown - 23 students (1.1%)
Native American/Alaskan - 4 students (0.2%)
Hawaiian/Pacific Islander - 2 students (0.1%)

References

Virginia Commonwealth University
Engineering schools and colleges in the United States
Engineering universities and colleges in Virginia
1996 establishments in Virginia
Educational institutions established in 1996